Romeis is a surname. Notable people with the surname include:

 Jacob Romeis (1835–1904), American politician
 Leonhard Romeis (1854–1904), German architect

See also 

 Romei